Hillhead (Ward 11) is one of the 23 wards of Glasgow City Council. On its creation in 2007 and in 2012 it returned four council members, using the single transferable vote system. For the 2017 Glasgow City Council election, the boundaries were changed substantially, the ward slightly decreased in population and returned three members.

Boundaries
Situated to the west of Glasgow city centre, the core of the ward which has remained since its 2007 creation consists of Hillhead, Kelvinbridge, Gilmorehill (the University of Glasgow main campus), Woodlands and Woodside, with boundaries being the M8 motorway to the south-east and the Port Dundas branch of the Forth and Clyde Canal to the north-east.

Other aspects of the ward were substantially altered in 2017, with the Dowanhill and Hyndland neighbourhoods reassigned to a new Partick East/Kelvindale ward and Byres Road becoming the south-west boundndary; most of the North Kelvinside neighbourhood (streets to the east of Queen Margaret Drive, which became Hillhead's north-west boundary) was gained from the Canal ward, and the Park District (along with Kelvingrove Park itself) was gained from the Anderston/City ward, with the park's south entrances the new southern boundary of Hillhead.

Following these alterations, it was the smallest ward in physical size but the most densely populated, despite the park taking up a proportion of the territory.

Demographics
According to the 2011 census, the ethnicity of the population was:

Councillors

Election results

2022 election
2022 Glasgow City Council election

2017 election
2017 Glasgow City Council election

2012 election
2012 Glasgow City Council election

2011 by-election
On 17 November 2011 a by-election was held following the death of SNP councillor George Roberts. The seat was held by the SNP's Ken Andrew.

2007 election
2007 Glasgow City Council election

See also
Wards of Glasgow

References

External links
Listed Buildings in Hillhead Ward, Glasgow City at British Listed Buildings

Wards of Glasgow
Hillhead